Middle College High School at Durham Technical Community College, often abbreviated Middle College High School@DTCC or MCHS@DTCC, is a public high school located in Durham, North Carolina. It is part of the Durham Public Schools system. Middle College High School is located on the campus of Durham Technical Community College.

Students
Only juniors and seniors may matriculate into this high school. Students may take both high school and college classes at no cost to students. Students are accepted from three school districts: Durham Public Schools, Orange County Schools, and Chapel Hill-Carrboro City Schools.

References

University-affiliated schools in the United States
Public high schools in North Carolina
Schools in Durham County, North Carolina
Durham Technical Community College